Exorcising the blind and mute man is one of the miracles of Jesus in the Gospels.
 It appears in Matthew 12:22-32, Luke 11:14-23 and Mark 3:20-30.

According to the Gospels, Jesus healed a demon-possessed man who was blind and mute, so that he could both talk and see. People were astonished and said, "Could this be the Son of David?"

But when the Pharisees heard this, they said, "It is only by Beelzebul, the prince of demons, that this fellow drives out demons."

Jesus said to them:
"Every kingdom divided against itself will be ruined, and every city or household divided against itself will not stand. If Satan drives out Satan, he is divided against himself. How then can his kingdom stand? And if I drive out demons by Beelzebul, by whom do your people drive them out? So then, they will be your judges. But if it is by the finger of God that I drive out demons, then the kingdom of God has come upon you. Or again, how can anyone enter a strong man's house and carry off his possessions without first tying up the strong man? Then his house can be plundered. Whoever is not with me is against me, and whoever does not gather with me scatters. And so I tell you, people will be forgiven every sin and blasphemy. But blasphemy against the Spirit will not be forgiven. Anyone who speaks a word against the Son of Man will be forgiven, but anyone who speaks against the Holy Spirit will not be forgiven, either in this age or in the age to come." Matthew 12:25-32

Arnold Fruchtenbaum argues that since Jewish exorcists would ask for the demon's name as part of their procedure, the tradition had developed that only the Messiah would be able to exorcise a mute spirit.

See also
 Exorcism
 Finger of God (Commandments)
 Life of Jesus in the New Testament
 Ministry of Jesus
 Miracles of Jesus
 Parables of Jesus

References

Exorcisms of Jesus
Mythological blind people